The Cocoa Rookie League, based in Cocoa and Melbourne, Florida, was an American minor professional baseball league that operated for one season, .  One of the first spring training-complex-based circuits, it was graded at the Rookie-league level, which is the lowest level of minor league baseball.

History

Instruction-driven league for youngsters
Its four teams were owned and operated by Major League Baseball teams seeking a means to develop 18- and 19-year-old players who had just signed their first professional contracts. The complex-based teams charged no admission (individual attendance records were not kept) and the emphasis was on baseball fundamentals instruction for the young players.

The four teams — operated by the Detroit Tigers, Houston Colt .45s, Minnesota Twins and New York Mets — competed against each other in a league schedule of over 50 games, with the Twins' entry — led by 19—year-old Rod Carew, a future member of the Baseball Hall of Fame — taking the CRL pennant by five games over the Mets' club.  Total attendance for the year was only 1,683. The Cocoa Rookie League folded after the season, while the Sarasota—based circuit became the basis for the Gulf Coast League, which still plays today. A successor to the CRL, the Florida East Coast League, operated in 1972 in Cocoa and Melbourne.

Cocoa Rookie League teams

Cocoa Colts
Cocoa Mets

Cocoa Tigers
Melbourne Twins

Standings & statistics 
1964 Cocoa Rookie League
All games played at Cocoa, FloridaTotal Attendance: 1,683Playoffs: None Scheduled.

References

External links
Cocoa Rookie League page in Baseball Reference

Defunct minor baseball leagues in the United States
Baseball leagues in Florida
1964 in sports in Florida
1964 in baseball
1964 establishments in Florida
1964 disestablishments in Florida
Sports leagues established in 1964
Sports leagues disestablished in 1964
Cocoa, Florida
Melbourne, Florida